Edmond de Favières, full name Edmond Guillaume François de Favières, (8 November 1755 – 13 March 1837) was a French playwright and politician.

Works 
 Paul et Virginie, comédie en trois actes et en prose (1791)
 Les Espiègleries de garnison, comédie en trois actes (1792)
 Lisbeth, drame lyrique en trois actes et en prose (1797)
 Elisca ou l'Amour maternel, drame lyrique en trois actes (1799)
 Fanny Morna, ou l’Écossaise, drame lyrique en trois actes (1799)

librettist
 Jean et Geneviève, 1-act comedy by Jean-Pierre Sollié with a libretto by Edmond de Favière (1792)
 L’Officier de fortune, 3-act drama by André Grétry (1792 but unperformed)

External links 
 Edmond de Favières on Data.bnf.fr

1755 births
1837 deaths
People from Montluçon
Members of the Legislative Assembly (France)
French opera librettists
18th-century French dramatists and playwrights